Powersports are a subset category of motorsports which generally include vehicles such as motorcycles, all-terrain vehicles (ATVs), snowmobiles, personal water craft, and scooters. One of the defining features of any powersport is the use of an engine, in one form or another. Other defining features of powersport vehicles include the use of handlebars to control movement and the mounting of the rider "on" the machine, exposed to the elements. Powersports have always had a following as spectator sports, and with the introduction of the X-Games, even the most extreme, fringe varieties have become commonly known. Powersports are the most common vehicles in the X-games.

References

Motorsport